John O'Connor may refer to:

Clergy
 John O'Connor (Archdeacon of Emly) ( 1854–1904), Archdeacon of Emly, 1880–1904
 John J. O'Connor (bishop of Newark) (1855–1927), Roman Catholic Bishop of Newark
 John O'Connor (priest) (1870–1952), British Roman Catholic priest, model for the fictional detective Father Brown
 John O'Connor (cardinal) (1920–2000), Roman Catholic Archbishop of New York

Politicians
 John O'Connor (Canadian politician) (1824–1887)
 John O'Connor (Lord Mayor of Dublin) ( 1835–1891), Lord Mayor of Dublin and MP for South Kerry
 John O'Connor (North Kildare MP) (1850–1928)
 John O'Connor (Australian politician) (1878–1937), member of the South Australian House of Assembly
 John J. O'Connor (New York representative) (1885–1960), US Representative from New York
John J. O'Connor (Brooklyn politician) (1855–1898), member of the New York State Assembly
 John M. O'Connor (born 1954), Attorney General of Oklahoma
 John S. O'Connor (1896–1967), Irish politician

Sportspeople
 John O'Connor (English cricketer) (1867–1936)
 John O'Connor (Australian cricketer) (1868–1952)
 John O'Connor (Cork hurler) ( 1890s)
 John O'Connor (athlete) (1893–1977), Irish Olympic athlete
 John C. O'Connor (1878–1922), American college football coach
 Johnny O'Connor (baseball) (1891–1982), Major League Baseball player
 Johnny O'Connor (hurler) (1928–2010), Irish hurler who played for Waterford
 John O'Connor (Wexford hurler) (born 1965), Irish hurler who played for Wexford
 Johnny O'Connor (born 1980), Irish rugby union player

Others
 John O'Connor (painter) (1830–1889), Irish painter
 John Jay O'Connor (1930–2009), American lawyer and husband of United States Supreme Court Justice Sandra Day O'Connor
 John J. O'Connor (historian) (1904-1978), American historian and sociologist
 John J. O'Connor (journalist) (1933–2009), American journalist and critic
 John O'Connor (musician) (born 1949), guitarist, TV composer and recording artist from London
 John Kennedy O'Connor (born 1964), television and radio broadcaster
 John J. O'Connor (artist) (born 1972), American artist
 John J. O'Connor (mathematician) ( 1990s–2010s), owner of MacTutor History of Mathematics archive
 John T. Connor, American government official and businessman

See also
 John Conner (disambiguation)
 John Connor (disambiguation)
 Carroll O'Connor (1924–2001), American actor born John O'Connor
 Jack O'Connor (disambiguation)
 John O'Conor (born 1947), Irish pianist
 Jon O'Connor (born 1976), English footballer
 John O'Connor Power (1846–1919), Irish politician